Two ships of the United States Navy have been named Arco for Arco, Idaho.

  was an auxiliary repair dock, originally named USS ARD-29, later loaned, then sold, to Iran.

Sources
 

United States Navy ship names